A Woman Unknown may refer to:
A 2012 novel by Frances Brody
A memoir by Lucia Graves